Haynach Lakes (also, Murphy Lakes) is a lake in Grand County, Colorado.

References

Lakes of Rocky Mountain National Park
Lakes of Grand County, Colorado